Debi Carson is a contemporary artist and interior designer. Her abstract paintings on canvas and surfboards are found in public and private collections throughout the world.

Biography
Debi Carson earned a Bachelor of Science degree in interior design from Stephen F. Austin State University in Nacogdoches, Texas and has held an NCIDQ certificate since 2001. Debi's early career was spent in custom residential design and interior merchandising throughout the continental US. Debi moved to Baltimore, Maryland, U.S. to continue work in interior merchandising and expanded her design experience to include hospitality and commercial specialties. She relocated to Tortola in the British Virgin Islands in 2001 to continue interior design work and the creation of original contemporary art. She has been a frequent contributor to travel publications including Inflight magazine and MACO Caribbean Living and recently Virgin Islands Property and Yacht magazine.

Interior design
Debi's interior design work is most recognized for her abstract art characterized by vivid colors. Her project portfolio includes Peter Island Resort (Condé Nast Traveler “Gold List” 2007) and law firm  Conyers, Dill & Pearman.

Art
Debi Carson has utilised surfboards as a medium in her collaboration with a local, recognised surfboard designer and shaper. and also has numerous painting collections, mainly in the BVI, some of which have been published in the local media and magazines  such as VIPY.

Notes

External links
Official website 
Peter Island interior design by Debi Carson

Living people
Stephen F. Austin State University alumni
Artists from Baltimore
Year of birth missing (living people)